Koottukar may refer to:

Koottukar (1966 film), Malayalam film starring Prem Nazir and Sathyan
Koottukar (2010 film), Malayalam film starring Viu Mohan and Bhama